Kiel is a city in northern Germany.

Kiel may also refer to:

 Kiel (electoral district), a Bundestag constituency in Kiel
 Kiel (name)
 Kiel (mountain), Saxony, Germany
 Kiel, Missouri, US
 Kiel, Wisconsin, US
 Loyal, Oklahoma, US, originally Kiel

See also 
 
 
 Keal (disambiguation)
 Keel (disambiguation)
 Keele (disambiguation)
 Kil (disambiguation)
 Kile (disambiguation)
 Kill (disambiguation)
 Kyl (disambiguation)
 Kyle (disambiguation)
 Kyll, a river in Germany